The Hidden is the 39th book in the Animorphs series. It was ghostwritten by Laura Battyanyi-Wiess (as K. A. Applegate). It is narrated by Cassie.

Plot summary
The Yeerks repair a downed Helmacron ship and use its sensors to track the Escafil Device and the Animorphs morphing abilities. Cassie is forced to relocate the Escafil Device. During the process, a Cape buffalo and an ant inadvertently gain the morphing ability. The buffalo morphs Chapman and begins to learn speech, and the ant morphs Cassie. Cassie kills the ant when it demorphs, and near the end of the book the buffalo is killed by a Dracon beam. However, the Animorphs come up with a plan similar to The Andalite's Gift, in which Cassie morphs a humpback whale in midair to destroy the helicopter carrying the Helmacron ship.

Morphs

The book alludes to Tobias and Ax possibly being in wolf morphs; however, neither possess wolf morphs and, by the end of the series, never managed to.

Animorphs books
2000 novels